Tillandsia takizawae is a species of flowering plant in the genus Tillandsia. This species is endemic to Mexico.

References

takizawae
Flora of Mexico
Plants described in 2000